Jonathan Gibbs may refer to:
Jonathan Clarkson Gibbs (1821–1874), Presbyterian minister and powerful African-American Florida officeholder during Reconstruction
Jonathan Gibbs (composer) (fl. 1983–1986), British composer for the BBC Radiophonic Workshop between 1983 and 1986
Jonathan Gibbs (bishop) (born 1961), area Bishop of Huddersfield in the Church of England Diocese of Leeds
Jonathan Gibbs (1975–2003), co-pilot of Air Midwest Flight 5481

See also
John Gibbs (disambiguation)
Jonny Gibb of Survivor